Justice Matthias may refer to:

Edward S. Matthias, associate justice of the Ohio Supreme Court
John M. Matthias, associate justice of the Ohio Supreme Court